Kildevældsparken is a small park in the outer Østerbro district of Copenhagen, Denmark. It is bounded by Vognmandsmarken/Bellmansgade and Borgervænget. It has an area of 0.77 hectares and contains a lake.

History
The lake was created  as a result of extraction of gravel and clay for the construction of the Freeport in the 1880s. The park was established in 1926–27. It takes its name after a former country house and restaurant which was located at the corner of Østerbrogade Kildevældsgade. The park was protected in 1977

See also
 Kildevæld Church

References

Parks in Copenhagen
Østerbro